Shana Woods (born July 7, 1988 in Bellflower, California) is an American track and field athlete.  She holds the current national high school record in the multiple event heptathlon, which she set while attending Long Beach Polytechnic High School in Long Beach, California.  She has exhibited proficiency in a variety of events.  While still a sophomore at Long Beach Poly, she joined her teammates, including senior Shalonda Solomon in setting national high school records in the 4 × 400 metres relay, 4 × 200 metres relay and indoor 4 × 400 metres relay.  All those records still stand.  The indoor record also counts as the current U.S. Junior record.

At the 2004 CIF California State Meet, sophomore Woods won the individual Long Jump and including running on the relay accounted for 32 points as her team won the State Championship.  As a senior in 2006, she won the 100 meters hurdles and 300 meter hurdles along with anchoring Poly to three relay wins at the Arcadia Invitational.  At the state meet, Poly was beaten by crosstown rival Wilson.

After setting her heptathlon record of 5,533 points at the 2006 USATF Junior Championships, she was chosen to represent the USA at the 2006 World Junior Championships in Athletics and the 2007 Pan American Junior Athletics Championships, where she earned the silver medal.  She continued her education at the University of Southern California, majoring in Political Science.

References

External links

Living people
1988 births
American heptathletes
American female hurdlers
American female long jumpers
University of Southern California alumni
African-American female track and field athletes
Track and field athletes from California
21st-century African-American sportspeople
21st-century African-American women
20th-century African-American people
20th-century African-American women